The Foxtrot class was the NATO reporting name of a class of diesel-electric patrol submarines that were built in the Soviet Union. The Soviet designation of this class was Project 641. The Foxtrot class was designed to replace the earlier Zulu class, which suffered from structural weaknesses and harmonic vibration problems that limited its operational depth and submerged speed. The first Foxtrot keel was laid down in 1957 and commissioned in 1958 and the last was completed in 1983. A total of 58 were built for the Soviet Navy at the Sudomekh division of the Admiralty Shipyard (now Admiralty Wharves), Saint Petersburg. Additional hulls were built for other countries.

The Foxtrot class was comparable in performance and armament to most contemporary designs. However, its three screws made it noisier than most Western designs. Moreover, the Foxtrot class was one of the last designs introduced before the adoption of the teardrop hull, which offered much better underwater performance. Also, although the Foxtrot was larger than a Zulu class submarine, the Foxtrot class had 2 of its 3 decks dedicated to batteries.  This gave it an underwater endurance of 10 days, but the weight of the batteries made the Foxtrot's average speed a slow  at its maximum submerged time capability. Due to the batteries taking up 2 decks, onboard conditions were crowded, with space being relatively small even when compared to older submarines such as the much older American Balao-class submarine. The Foxtrot class was completely obsolete by the time the last submarine was launched. The Russian Navy retired its last Foxtrots between 1995 and 2000; units were scrapped and disposed of for museum purposes. During the division of the Soviet Black Sea Fleet, in 1997 one Foxtrot class submarine (later renamed as Zaporizhzhia) was passed to Ukraine as it was not operational since 1991. The ship never effectively served in the Ukrainian Navy and was under repair. In 2005 Ukrainian Ministry of Defence wanted to sell it, but was unsuccessful.  Following successful post-repair trials in June 2013, it was recognised as operational. However, on 22 March 2014 it was surrendered to or captured by Russia as part of the Russian annexation of Crimea. Russia decided not to accept it due to its age and operational unsuitability. Its subsequent status is unknown.

Cuban Missile Crisis
Project 641s played a central role in some of the most dramatic incidents of the Cuban Missile Crisis. The Soviet Navy deployed four Project 641 submarines to Cuba. US Navy destroyers dropped practice depth charges near Project 641 subs near Cuba in efforts to force them to surface and be identified. Three of the four Project 641 submarines were forced to surface, one eluded US forces.

Units 
Following is a list of 58 of the 75 Foxtrot-class submarines built during the Soviet Project 641.

Operators
Most saw service in the Soviet Navy. Foxtrots were also built for the Indian Navy (eight units, from 1967 to 1974), Libyan (six units, from 1978 to 1980), and Cuban (six units, from 1978 to 1983) navies. Some Soviet Foxtrots later saw service in the Polish and Ukrainian navies.
 Soviet Navy (passed on to successor states)
 Russian navy (ex–Soviet Navy)
 Libyan Navy 6 units (2 left but probably abandoned)
 Cuban Navy 6 units 
Polish Navy 2 units (ex–Soviet Navy)
ORP Wilk (1987–2003)
ORP Dzik (1988–2003)
 Ukrainian Navy 1 unit, has been taken over by Russian forces during the 2014 Crimean crisis.

On display
Several Foxtrots are on display as museums around the world, including:
 B-413 at Kaliningrad, Russia. 
 B-440 at Vytegra, a port on the Volga–Baltic Waterway in Russia.
 U-475 Black Widow at Strood, Kent, United Kingdom
 Indian Foxtrot submarine INS Kursura S20 at the Rama Krishna Beach, Visakhapatnam, India.

References

 
 А.Б. Широкорад: Советские подводные лодки послевоенной постройки (A.B. Shirokorad: Sowjet Submarines built after WWII) Moscow, 1997,  (Russian)
 Y. Apalkow: Корабли ВМФ СССР. Многоцелевые ПЛ и ПЛ спецназначания ("Ships of the USSR - Multi-purpose submarines and Special submarines"), St Petersburg, 2003,  (Russian)

External links

https://fas.org/man/dod-101/sys/ship/row/rus/641.htm 
https://fas.org/man/dod-101/sys/ship/row/rus/index.html 
 HNSA Ship Page: Soviet B-413
 Foxtrot Class Submarines - Complete Ship List (English)
 Project 641 at deepstorm.ru (Russian)
 Photos and history of the submarine Foxtrot in Rochester UK

Russian and Soviet navy submarine classes